Rhea Litré (born Joshua Miller on October 28, 1984) is an American drag queen, singer, songwriter, and DJ. She is a fixture in West Hollywood nightlife.

Career
After graduating from high school, Miller moved to Los Angeles to audition for the second season of American Idol. She first performed in drag at Oasis Nightclub's Drag Idol in 2004 in Upland, California. Raja and Mayhem Miller are Litré's drag mothers.

Litré was a member of the band Tranzkuntinental, which made its debut at The Roxy in 2009. The band was started by Charlie Paulson and Xander Smith and featured drag queens Willam Belli, Detox Icunt, Kelly Mantle, and Vicky Vox.

In 2012, Willam Belli and Rhea Litré released "Let's Have a Kai Kai." The song parodied "Let's Have a Kiki" by the Scissor Sisters. The music video was directed by Shawn Adeli and featured an appearance by Chi Chi LaRue.

In 2013, Litré walked the Marco Marco runway for Los Angeles Fashion Week. Other models included former RuPaul's Drag Race contestants.

Litré has released a series of singles including "America's Next Hot Bottom" in 2013, "UCC" in 2015, and "Lovergirl" in 2016.

Discography

Singles

Filmography

Film

Television

Music videos

References

External links
 
 
 
 
 

1984 births
Living people
American drag queens
American LGBT musicians